Montreal Metro, Metro Montreal, or, variation, may refer to:

 Métro de Montréal, known in English as the Montreal Metro, the subway system of Montreal, Quebec, Canada
 Métro (Montreal newspaper), aka Montréal Métro, a free daily French-language newspaper for Montreal, Quebec, Canada
 Greater Montreal, (GMA; Montreal Metro Region or Metro Montreal) the metropolitan region of Montreal, Quebec, Canada
 Montreal Metropolitan Community (MMC/CMM), the regional government of the metropolitan region of Montreal
 Urban agglomeration of Montreal (UAM/AUM), the regional government of the Island of Montreal
 Montreal Urban Community (MUC/CUM), the former regional government of the Island of Montreal
 Montreal (region) (region #6) the subprovincial level division containing the Island of Montreal, includes Montreal County (compte de Montreal), the former county level division of the province of Quebec

See also

 
 
 Metro (disambiguation)
 Montreal (disambiguation)
 Réseau express métropolitain, the rapid transit light rail system of Montreal, Quebec, Canada
 Montreal bus rapid transit, the former and future BRT system of Montreal, Quebec, Canada